Sister, Sister is an American sitcom that was created by Kim Bass, Gary Gilbert, Fred Shafferman that originally aired on ABC and later The WB. It premiered on April 1, 1994, and ended on May 23, 1999, with a total of 119 episodes over the course of 6 seasons.

Series overview

Episodes

Season 1 (1994)

Season 2 (1994–95)

Season 3 (1995–96)

Season 4 (1996–97)

Season 5 (1997–98)

Season 6 (1998–99)

References

External links
 

Lists of American sitcom episodes
Lists of American teen comedy television series episodes